António Carvalho da Silva (11 November 1850 – 1 June 1893), known as Silva Porto, was a Portuguese naturalist painter.

Biography
Born in Porto, he studied there under João António Correia and Tadeu de Almeida Furtado, then continued his studies in Paris and Rome.

While in Paris he exhibited his work in the Salon and in the World's Fair of 1878. In Paris, he studied with his friend João Marques de Oliveira, where they were pupils of Adolphe Yvon and Alexandre Cabanel. They became followers of the naturalist Barbizon School, and brought the new school of painting to Portugal, when they returned in 1879.

Silva Porto become one of the most acclaimed naturalist painters of his generation, showing the heritage of Jean-Baptiste-Camille Corot and Charles-François Daubigny. Secondary effects from impressionism can sometimes be found in his paintings.

He died in 1893 in Lisbon. His work is represented at the Chiado Museum, in Lisbon, and at the National Museum Soares dos Reis, in Porto.

Selected paintings

External links

Six Centuries of Portuguese Painting, catalogue from the University of Coimbra

1850 births
Artists from Porto
1893 deaths
19th-century Portuguese painters
Portuguese male painters
19th-century male artists
University of Porto alumni